This list contains all cultural property of national significance (class A) in the canton of Zug from the 2009 Swiss Inventory of Cultural Property of National and Regional Significance. It is sorted by municipality and contains 16 individual buildings, 10 collections and 5 archaeological finds.

The geographic coordinates provided are in the Swiss coordinate system as given in the Inventory.

Baar

Cham

Hünenberg

Menzingen

Neuheim

Risch-Rotkreuz

Unterägeri

Zug

References
 All entries, addresses and coordinates are from:

External links
 Swiss Inventory of Cultural Property of National and Regional Significance, 2009 edition:

PDF documents: Class B objects
Geographic information system